Affirming Catholicism, sometimes referred to as AffCath, is a movement operating in several provinces of the Anglican Communion, including the United Kingdom, Ireland, Canada and the United States. In the US, the movement is known as Affirming Anglican Catholicism (AAC). The movement represents a liberal strand of Anglo-Catholicism and is particularly noted for holding that Anglo-Catholic belief and practice is compatible with the ordination of women. It also generally supports ordination into the threefold ministry (bishops, priests, deacons) regardless of gender or sexual orientation.

The movement was formalised on 9 June 1990 at St Alban's Church, Holborn, in London by a number of Anglo-Catholic clergy in the Diocese of London who had been marginalised within, or expelled from, existing Anglo-Catholic groups because of their support for women's ordination to the priesthood. It developed a theological stance which was staunchly liberal in matters of inclusivity but traditionally Catholic in matters of liturgy and the centrality and theology of the sacraments whilst believing that traditional restrictions on who may receive them should be re-examined.

In North America, AAC has ties with the Society of Catholic Priests; in the UK, AffCath is a partner organisation of Inclusive Church.

Membership and support
Prominent supporters include Rowan Williams, former archbishop of Canterbury; as well as Jeffrey John, Dean of St Albans and former bishop suffragan-designate of Reading; both of whom have served on the executive committee of British and Irish Affirming Catholicism. In North America, bishops involved in AAC include Frank Griswold, former presiding bishop of the Episcopal Church; Andrew Hutchison, former primate of the Anglican Church of Canada; and Victoria Matthews, a bishop in Canada and New Zealand.

Presidents
The president of Affirming Catholicism is a bishop who acts as a figurehead for the movement.

?–2011: David Stancliffe, Bishop of Salisbury
2011–2014: Michael Perham, Bishop of Gloucester
2015–present: Stephen Cottrell, Archbishop of York

Chairpersons
Affirming Catholicism is governed by a board of directors and headed by a chairperson.

1996 to ? John B. Gaskell
2004–2007: Richard Jenkins
2008–2012: Jonathan Clark
2012–2018: Rosemarie Mallett
2018–present: Hannah Cleugh

See also

 Acts of Supremacy
 English Reformation
 Dissolution of the Monasteries
 Ritualism in the Church of England
 Apostolicae curae
 Forward in Faith

References

External links
Affirming Catholicism UK
Affirming Catholicism USA
Anglo-Catholicism for Progressives

Anglican organizations
Anglicanism in the United Kingdom
Anglo-Catholicism
LGBT and Anglicanism